Anthony John Sacca (born April 17, 1970) is a former quarterback who played for the Penn State Nittany Lions football team from 1988 to 1991 and who played briefly in the NFL for the Phoenix Cardinals. He also played two seasons for the Barcelona Dragons in Spain.

Sacca grew up in Delran Township, New Jersey, and played high school football at Delran High School.

References

External links
Tony Sacca at database Football

1970 births
Living people
Delran High School alumni
People from Delran Township, New Jersey
American football quarterbacks
Penn State Nittany Lions football players
Phoenix Cardinals players
Barcelona Dragons players
Players of American football from New Jersey
Sportspeople from Burlington County, New Jersey
American expatriate players of American football